Requa may refer to:

Grapes
 Requa (grape), variety of grape

People
 John Requa, American screenwriter
 Mark L. Requa (1866–1937), American mining engineer and conservationist
 Richard Requa (1881–1941), San Diego architect

Places
United States
 Requa, California, community in Del Norte County
 Requa, Wisconsin, a community in Jackson County